Boulder Airport  is a public airport located two miles (3 km) south of the central business district of Boulder, a town in Jefferson County, Montana, United States. It is owned by the Town of Boulder and Jefferson County.

Facilities and aircraft 
For the 12-month period ending August 13, 2007, the airport had 600 general aviation aircraft operations, an average of 50 per month.

References

External links 
 

Airports in Montana
Buildings and structures in Jefferson County, Montana
Transportation in Jefferson County, Montana